Eschmann may refer to:
 Ernst Wilhelm Eschmann
 Eschmann introducer used to facilitate tracheal intubation